Ricardo Miles (born 9 September), known professionally as Rimzee, is a British rapper and songwriter. He is from Clapton, East London. Rimzee gained popularity in 2011 and released his debut mixtape The Upper Clapton Dream in 2012.

In 2022, Rimzee most recently released his acclaimed third mixtape, Cold Feet which peaked at number 11 on the UK Albums Chart.

Music career 
In 2010, Rimzee released his first video "2010 Freestyle / New York Minute Remix".  He later released The Upper Clapton Dream with singles such as "Here I Am", "I'm On", "Keep Stackin'", "Everyday" and his cover of Adele's "Hometown" in 2012. 

In July 2013, Rimzee was officially sentenced to 13 years in jail for shooting at an unmarked police car - curtailing his burgeoning music career. He was released on licence after serving six-and-a-half years.

Following Rimzee's return home from jail, in 2019, he released his second mixtape, Upper Clapton Dream 2 on 27 November 2020. The charting mixtape included features from Potter Payper, M24, Snap Capone and Haile (from WSTRN); with "Xabsi", "Lifestyle Cold",  "Jada & Styles" and "Anything" being some of the standout tracks.

Rimzee's Upper Clapton Dream mixtape series name was inspired by Black the Ripper's mixtape, The Edmonton Dream.

In 2021, Rimzee released singles "PTSD", "Split Decisions" and "Expensive Pain" featuring Born Trappy, leading BBC Radio 1Xtra to announce Rimzee as one of their Hot for 2022 artists on 14 December.

Rimzee released his third official mixtape, entitled Cold Feet on October 14th 2022; featuring the likes of Giggs, Young Adz, Emeli Sandé and more. In the project's first week of release, it charted independently at number 11 - just shy of top 10 in the UK's Official Album Charts, while being number 1 in the Official Hip Hop and R&B Album Charts

Business career 
In 2021, Rimzee announced the opening of his fast food establishment, Burgers & Bagels, located in Fulham, South West London.

Discography

Mixtapes

References 

Rappers from London
1991 births
Living people
British male songwriters